The R698 road is a regional road in County Kilkenny and County Waterford, Ireland. It runs from Callan southwards, crossing the River Suir and ending near Portlaw.

References

Regional roads in the Republic of Ireland
Roads in County Kilkenny
Roads in County Waterford